"Shang-a-Lang" is a song from the Bay City Rollers 1974 debut album [[Rollin' (Bay City Rollers album)|Rollin''']], from which it was the second advance single, the track being produced by the song's writers Bill Martin and Phil Coulter.

Background and chart success
Songwriter Bill Martin described "Shang-a-Lang" as an attempt to combine Brill Building songwriting - in particular the partly onomatopoeic lines of "Da Doo Ron Ron" - with the clanging sounds he'd long heard emanating from the shipyards in the Glasgow burgh of Govan where he'd been born and raised. According to Bill Martin: "I couldn't write clang clang because [of the well-known] Judy Garland [song lyric from] 'Trolley Song': 'Clang clang clang went the trolley'. So eventually I came up with: 'We sang shang-a-lang'".  Martin also recalled "shang-a-lang" as a minced oath he'd been wont to use when his mother was in earshot. Martin's collaborator Phil Coulter created the track's clapping sound by hitting two pieces of wood together as he had in their 1970 writing success, "Back Home", by the England football team.

"Shang-a-Lang" was Bay City Roller's fifth single release and their third to place in the UK charts, its tenure being ten weeks in the spring of 1974 with a peak of number 2 being held off from the number 1 position by another nostalgic track: "Sugar Baby Love" by The Rubettes. 

"Shang-a-Lang" would be the first Bay City Rollers single released in Canada where the group would soon become massively popular. However the original "Shang-a-Lang" was expediently covered by Montreal-based session group Tinker's Moon whose version charted at #23 in Canada: the Tinker's Moon version also gave "Shang-a-Lang" what attention the song would receive in the US reaching number 111 on the Record World'' Singles Chart 101 - 150.

The Rollers went on to use the title for their TV series, which began in April 1975, and ran for twenty-one episodes.

References 

1974 songs
1974 singles
Bell Records singles
Bay City Rollers songs
Songs written by Bill Martin (songwriter)
Songs written by Phil Coulter